Trechus shchurovi is a species of ground beetle in the subfamily Trechinae. It was described by Belousov & Kabak in 1996.

References

shchurovi
Beetles described in 1996